George Selwyn Goldsbro’ was the son of Dr. Charles Field Goldsboro, who had emigrated to New Zealand in 1860, serving as a surgeon during the New Zealand Wars. Charles Goldsboro finished his medical degree at Sydney University in 1868 and returned to Auckland, where his son George was born in 1870.

George studied under R. Mackay Fripp from 1884 to 1888. Fripp had arrived in Auckland in 1881, opened an architectural office and later became the secretary of the Auckland Society of Arts, where he introduced architecture classes and competitions. In 1888 Fripp left for Canada and Goldsbro’ for Australia. Goldsbro’ worked in Sydney and Melbourne under Sulman & Power, Howard Joseland and Theo Kemnis. In 1896 Fripp joined Goldsbro' in partnership in Auckland but left again in 1898 for Canada.

Goldsbro’ was the Hon Architect to the Anglican Diocese and designed the chapel of St Saviour's Papatoetoe; the Presbyterian church in Uxbridge Road, Howick; St Luke's in Russell Road Manurewa, St George's Parish Hall Papatoetoe; the Orphans’ Home Papatoetoe and the Paterson wing at St. John's College.

Goldbro’ designed many houses, including his own house at 66 Gillies Ave (1905); the Bloomfield house Gladstone Road (demolished 1999); the Goldie house St Georges Bay Road (demolished); the Friend house 33 Owens Road; the Coates house Pencarrow Ave; the Kidd house 74 Gillies Ave (1903); 11 Kimberley Road; 23 Seaview Road and 20 Ōrākei Road.

From 1902 to 1909 Goldsbro' was in partnership with Henry Wade. In 1909 the firm designed the main building of Auckland Girls Grammar School. During the First World War Goldsbro' went into partnership with E Holm Biss, then the firm became Goldsbro' and Carter in 1920s.

This was the first architectural firm with a strong Arts and Crafts influence to initiate the shingle and tile movement in Auckland. The practice also trained several important Auckland architects, such as Gerald Jones and Frederick Browne.

References
- Clippings file, Auckland University Architecture Library

New Zealand architects
1870 births
Year of death missing